Scott Garrett may refer to:
 Scott Garrett, New Jersey Congressman
 Scott Garrett (musician), former drummer for Pop's Cool Love, The Cult and Dag Nasty
 T. Scott Garrett, member of the Virginia House of Delegates